Thepphithak Chindavong is a Laotian freestyle swimmer who competed in the 2008 Summer Olympics. He competed, and was eliminated in the heats.

See also
Swimming at the 2008 Summer Olympics – Men's 50 metre freestyle

External links
 
Thepphithak Chindavong

1991 births
Living people
Laotian male freestyle swimmers
Olympic swimmers of Laos
Swimmers at the 2008 Summer Olympics
Place of birth missing (living people)